Tiberius Claudius Paulinus was a Roman general and politician of the early third century.

Several inscriptions in Britain preserve details of his cursus honorum. The earliest office Paulinus held was legatus or commander of Legio II Augusta at Caerleon. After an unknown period of time, he was proconsular governor of Gallia Narbonensis for the term 216/217; this was followed by legatus Augusti pro praetor, or governorship of the imperial province of Gallia Lugdunensis around 218. He returned to Roman Britain where he served as legatus Augusti pro praetor of Britannia Inferior in 220.

He was a popular man.  While he was away governing Gaul, the Silures tribe set up an official monument, the Marble of Thorigny dedicated to him despite their usual hostility to Rome. This monument includes the text of a letter Paulinus sent to his friend, Sennius Sollemnis. By 221, he had been succeeded in Britain by Marius Valerianus.

References

Notes 

3rd-century Romans
Roman governors of Gallia Narbonensis
Roman governors of Gallia Lugdunensis
Roman governors of Britain
Ancient Roman generals
Ancient Romans in Britain